Estanislau "Estanis" Pedrola Fortuny (born 24 August 2003) is a Spanish professional footballer who plays as a forward for Barcelona Atlètic.

Club career
Born in Cambrils, Tarragona, Catalonia, Pedrola joined RCD Espanyol's youth setup in 2014, from local side CF Reus Deportiu. Released in 2019, he subsequently returned to Reus before joining FC Barcelona in June 2021, for the Juvenil A squad.

Pedrola made his senior debut with the reserves on 21 November 2021, coming on as a late substitute for Ferran Jutglà in a 0–2 Primera División RFEF away loss against Albacete Balompié. He scored his first senior goal on 12 December, netting the equalizer for the B's in a 3–1 home win over CD Alcoyano.

Pedrola made his first team – and La Liga – debut on 2 January 2022, replacing fellow youth graduate Ilias Akhomach in a 1–0 away success over RCD Mallorca.

Personal life
Pedrola was named after his great-grandfather, also named Estanislau, who fought in the World War II and died in a Nazi concentration camp.

Career statistics

Club

Notes

References

External links

2003 births
Living people
People from Baix Camp
Sportspeople from the Province of Tarragona
Spanish footballers
Footballers from Catalonia
Association football forwards
Primera Federación players
La Liga players
FC Barcelona Atlètic players
FC Barcelona players
RCD Espanyol footballers